Granata imbricata, common names the imbricate margarite, tiled false ear shell, true wide-mouthed shell, is a species of sea snail, a marine gastropod mollusk in the family Chilodontaidae.

Distribution
This marine species occurs off New South Wales, South Australia and Tasmania.

Description
The size of the shell varies between 19 mm and 43 mm. The solid shell is very much depressed. It is white with scattered reddish dots. Its surface is covered with
very numerous, close, equal spiral riblets, separated by deep interstices. Seen closely, it is finely scaly. It has a low, short spire. The four whorls widen with extreme rapidity. The subhorizontal aperture is transverse-oval. It is lined with a closely sulcate silvery and iridescent nacre. The broad columella is flattened, and a little concave. Its edge is arched and thin.

References

External links

 To Biodiversity Heritage Library (1 publication)
 To USNM Invertebrate Zoology Mollusca Collection
 

imbricata
Gastropods described in 1816